Otto Schubiger (6 January 1925 – 28 January 2019) was a Swiss ice hockey player. He played for the ZSC Lions, GCK Lions, and SC Rapperswil-Jona Lakers, winning the Swiss National League A championship in 1949 and 1961, both with ZSC. Internationally Schubiger played for the Swiss national team, winning a bronze medal at the 1948 Winter Olympics, and bronze medals at the 1951 and 1953 World Championships. He died on 28 January 2019.

References

External links

1925 births
2019 deaths
GCK Lions players
Ice hockey players at the 1948 Winter Olympics
Ice hockey players at the 1952 Winter Olympics
Medalists at the 1948 Winter Olympics
Olympic bronze medalists for Switzerland
Olympic ice hockey players of Switzerland
Olympic medalists in ice hockey
SC Rapperswil-Jona Lakers players
Swiss ice hockey centres
ZSC Lions players
Ice hockey people from Zürich